Everybody Loves a Winner is an album by American jazz pianist Freddie Redd recorded in 1990 and released on the Milestone label.

Reception 

The Allmusic review by Scott Yanow states: "Pianist Freddie Redd has not recorded all that much during his 45-year career, but most of his records have been special events. This particular set has eight of Redd's tightly arranged compositions being performed by a fine sextet".

Track listing 
All compositions by Freddie Redd
 "Give Me a Break" - 4:26
 "One Up" - 7:05
 "Melancholia" - 4:59
 "Everybody Loves a Winner" - 11:45
 "So Samba" - 8:03
 "And Time Marches On" - 9:03
 "One Down" - 7:13
 "Fuego de Corazon" - 8:08

Personnel 
 Freddie Redd - piano
 Curtis Peagler - alto saxophone
 Teddy Edwards - tenor saxophone
 Phil Ranelin - trombone
 Bill Langlois - bass
 Larry Hancock - drums

References 

1991 albums
Milestone Records albums
Freddie Redd albums